Asocainol is a class 1a anti-arrhythmic compound.

See also
Protostephanine

References

Antiarrhythmic agents